The World Group was the highest level of Davis Cup competition in 2001. The first-round losers went into the Davis Cup World Group Qualifying Round, and the winners progressed to the quarterfinals and were guaranteed a World Group spot for 2002.

France won the title, defeating Australia in the final, 3–2. The final was held at the Rod Laver Arena in Melbourne Park, Melbourne, Australia, from 30 November to 2 December. It was the French team's first Davis Cup title since 1996 and their 9th title overall. France won the title despite not playing a single match on home soil.

Participating teams

Draw

First round

Australia vs. Ecuador

Brazil vs. Morocco

Sweden vs. Czech Republic

Slovakia vs. Russia

Belgium vs. France

Switzerland vs. United States

Germany vs. Romania

Netherlands vs. Spain

Quarterfinals

Brazil vs. Australia

Sweden vs. Russia

Switzerland vs. France

Netherlands vs. Germany

Semifinals

Australia vs. Sweden

Netherlands vs. France

Final

Australia vs. France

References

External links
Davis Cup official website

World Group
Davis Cup World Group
Davis Cup